Dəstəfur (also, Dastafyur, Dəstətur, Dostafur, Dastaphour, Dastaphor and Dostafyur) is a village and municipality in the Dashkasan Rayon of Azerbaijan.  It has a population of 572. Between 1930 and 2 April 1956, Dashkasan Region was known as the Dastafurski Rayon (Dəstəfur Rayon)

Monuments
On the east of the village, over the Ganja River, is a historic stone bridge thought to date from the later 13th century. 
A list of Azerbaijan's ancient monuments also states that the village has a bronze age burial mound (kurgan)
In a pastoral valley accessible only on foot, are the reasonably intact walls of a ruined 15th-century church, described in Azerbaijani texts as an Albanian Temple (Albanian refers here to Caucasian Albania) or sometimes as Dəstəfur bazilikası
A 2017 TV programme filmed a visit to the church ruins.

References 

Populated places in Dashkasan District